Nikolayevsky District is an administrative district (raion), one of the thirty-three in Volgograd Oblast, Russia. As a municipal division, it is incorporated as Nikolayevsky Municipal District. It is located in the northeast of the oblast. Its administrative center is the town of Nikolayevsk. Population:  34,285 (2002 Census);  The population of Nikolayevsk accounts for 47.1% of the district's total population.

References

Notes

Sources

Districts of Volgograd Oblast